"Kryptonite (I'm on It)" is a song by rap group Purple Ribbon All-Stars released as the first single from their album Got Purp? Vol 2.

An official remix was made, which features Big Boi, Killer Mike, Busta Rhymes, Lil Wayne, Bubba Sparxxx, and Remy Ma.

In popular culture
The song is also featured in the drama film ATL.

Charts

Weekly charts

Year-end charts

Certifications

References

2005 songs
2006 debut singles
Posse cuts